Olive Marie Osmond (born October 13, 1959) is an American singer, actress, television host and a member of the show business family the Osmonds. Although she was never part of her family's singing group, she gained success as a country and pop music artist and television variety show cohost in the 1970s and 1980s. Her best-known song is a remake of the country pop ballad "Paper Roses". From 1976 to 1979, she and her singer brother Donny Osmond hosted the television variety show Donny & Marie.

Early life  

Olive Marie Osmond was born in Ogden, Utah, the eighth of nine children (and the only daughter) born to Olive May (1925–2004) and George Virl Osmond (1917–2007). She was raised as a member of the Church of Jesus Christ of Latter-day Saints. Her brothers are Virl, Tom, Alan, Wayne, Merrill, Jay, Donny, and Jimmy Osmond. From an early age, her brothers maintained a career in show business, singing and performing on national television. Osmond debuted as part of her brothers' act the Osmond Brothers on The Andy Williams Show when she was three, but generally did not perform with her brothers in the group's television performances through the 1960s.

Music career

1970s  

Marie was initially one of only two siblings (out of nine) in the Osmond family who was not involved in the music industry; Tom Osmond, who was deaf, was the other. (In addition to the original four Osmond Brothers, Donny and Jimmy, hearing-impaired oldest brother Virl Osmond worked behind the scenes on dance routines.) After the initial success of the Osmonds in 1970, Donny gained success as a solo artist on the popular music charts and became a teen idol. The Osmonds' mother persuaded Marie to record an album and she signed with the family's label MGM/Kolob Records and began making concert appearances with her brothers. As her brothers were playing rock music by 1972, Marie's music aimed toward a niche market the Osmond family had not yet targeted: country music.

In 1973, her debut single, "Paper Roses", reached the No.1 spot on two Billboard charts, a feat that not only placed her among an elite class of music royalty but also instantly catapulted her into international superstardom.  Marie earned a gold record for both the "Paper Roses" single and album, was nominated for two Grammy awards, and became the youngest female country artist with a No.1 debut song (a record she still holds today, 49 years later.) She released another single, "In My Little Corner of the World", and an album with the same title in 1974, both entering the Billboard country Top 40 in 1974. The title song on her next album, Who's Sorry Now, released in 1975, went to No. 40.  Additionally, in 1974, Osmond had two pop music duet hits with Donny: "I'm Leaving It All Up to You" and "Morning Side of the Mountain". The former song was a Top 20 country hit, with both songs reaching the Top 10 of the pop charts.  Another
duet with Donny, "Deep Purple", was popular, staying on the chart for six months and peaking at No.14.

In 1977, Osmond released her fourth studio album, titled This Is the Way That I Feel. This was much different from her earlier covers of country artist hits and went in more of a pop direction. This album included songs that were written for her as well as songs that were written by the Bee Gees. Only two singles were released from the album.

1980s  

In 1984, Osmond released a single on RCA Records titled "Who's Counting". The single peaked at No. 82 on Billboards Hot Country Singles. The single did receive a significant amount of airplay for a few weeks.

Osmond made a comeback in country music as a solo artist by signing a joint deal with Capitol Records and Curb Records, reuniting her with Mike Curb who was the major factor in the family's success in the early 1970s. In 1985, she recorded her first studio album in nearly seven years, There's No Stopping Your Heart. This album had four singles released from it, with two reaching the No.1 position on the country charts. The songs mainly focused on the more popular Countrypolitan style. The successful pairing with Dan Seals created a No. 1 hit on the country charts titled "Meet Me in Montana". The follow-up single was the title track, "There's No Stopping Your Heart", which also reached the No.1 position in early 1986. The final single, "Read My Lips", went on to become a top 10 hit.

The follow-up album in 1986 was titled I Only Wanted You. Osmond hit No. 1 again with a duet with Paul Davis titled "You're Still New to Me". The second single released was the title track "I Only Wanted You", which landed in the top 20. Two additional singles, "Everybody's Crazy 'Bout My Baby" and "Cry Just a Little", did not have the same success.

In 1988, Osmond released the album All in Love, and Steppin' Stone in 1989. Both albums failed to garner any success on the Billboard charts due to the changing styles of country music; Neotraditionalism was coming to the forefront at the expense of country pop acts such as the Osmonds. By 1991, further changes in the country music industry would effectively end her career as a significant recording artist. Steppin' Stone would be her last country album of the 1980s.

1990s 

In 1990, she did a song and a music video called "Get Closer", also known as "First Look" or "Gotta Get a Little Closer", to promote the premiere of children's television two-hour syndication block The Disney Afternoon.

Osmond released only one song that charted in 1995, "What Kind of Man (Walks On a Woman)".

2000s  

In November 2010, she released the album titled I Can Do This that was full of balladry and highlighted her multi-octave voice in the song Pie Jesu. The album contained 14 songs and all of the proceeds were donated to the Children's Miracle Network Hospitals.

2010s  

Osmond's latest work, Music Is Medicine, was announced through a social media campaign in late 2015. The online retailer Amazon.com along with Apple's iTunes and the brick and mortar giant Walmart made the album available on April 15, 2016, in both CD and digital format. An Amazon-only release of an autographed vinyl pressing was made available on November 18, 2016. This was Osmond's first new album in five years. The album was produced by Jason Deere, with whom she had worked in the past. Additional guest artists are Marty Roe, Olivia Newton-John, Sisqó, John Rich, and Alex Boyé. The album was released through Osmond's label Oliveme LLC.

Billboard Top Country Albums for the week of May 7, 2016, listed Music Is Medicine as a new entry in the No.10 position, marking the first return to the country charts for Osmond since the late 1980s.

On March 27, 2016, a video for the song "Then There's You" was released on the internet video site Vevo; it received almost 200,000 views in less than 48 hours. On April 13, 2016, the video for the title track was also released on Vevo; it was filmed with patients from Children's Miracle Hospitals.

One song that was recorded featuring the country group Diamond Rio and titled "More You" and an additional song titled "Got Me Cuz He Gets Me" disappeared on the release date, making the total song count ten instead of the twelve originally listed. Amazon posted a product alert stating "This tracklist is incorrect. While we work to update it, please refer to the digital track list." As of the release date, it was unclear whether these two tracks will become available at a later time.

2020s  

Originally announced while co-hosting The Talk and simultaneously on her social media, Marie said she was working on a new operatic album. In an article in People magazine on August 26, 2021, the album titled Unexpected, along with the official release date, was announced as December 10, 2021, with pre-orders available starting August 27, 2021. She has performed opera on a previous Christmas album, on Broadway, and during her Vegas residency.  Released December 10, 2021, "Unexpected" debuted at No.1 on the Billboard Classical Crossover chart, spent 24 weeks in the Top 10 and is available in vinyl and CD formats, as well as through multiple streaming services.  Marie continues to tour the United States and Canada performing to sold-out crowds, influencing countless audiences, and touching the hearts of multiple generations through her live performances.(BroadwayWorld.com, November 10, 2022.)

Acting career

Television  

In 1975, Marie Osmond and her brother Donny hosted a special variety show which was later picked up mid-season as a weekly variety show and began airing in 1976 as Donny & Marie, and ran on ABC until 1978 before it was renamed The Osmond Family Hour in 1979. Osmond's first made-for-TV movie was The Gift of Love which originally aired on ABC on December 5, 1978. The movie was loosely based on the O. Henry story The Gift of the Magi. Her co-star in the movie was Timothy Bottoms and she received her first on-screen kiss in this movie. The following year, Osmond starred in a sitcom pilot titled Marie which did not make the new season schedule. In 1980 she had her own variety show on NBC, also titled Marie, which only ran for half a season.

Marie had a minor role in the 1982 made-for-TV movie Rooster playing Sister Mae Davis.  The following year she starred in the television movie I Married Wyatt Earp playing the wife of Earp, Josephine 'Josie' Marcus. In 1984 Osmond voiced two animated characters, The Nursery Magic Fairy/Velveteen Rabbit in The Velveteen Rabbit and Rose Petal in the TV short titled Rose Petal Place and later in the TV movie Rose Petal Place: Real Friends.  Osmond then had a recurring role for two seasons as co-host with Jack Palance on ABC's documentary series Ripley's Believe It or Not! in 1985–86, replacing Palance's daughter Holly. She introduced and narrated segments based on the travels and discoveries of oddity-hunter Robert Ripley. Following that, the singer played her mother, Olive, in the television movie Side by Side: The True Story of the Osmond Family. The film was produced by her younger brother, Jimmy Osmond.

She returned to television in the 1995 ABC sitcom Maybe This Time playing Julia Wallace, a divorced single mother. The cast included Betty White who played her Mother and a young Ashley Johnson who played her daughter.  The series was set in a coffee shop showcasing the three women in everyday life. In 1998 she voiced the character of the Queen in Buster & Chauncey's Silent Night.

Osmond and her brother hosted a syndicated 60-minute talk show for three seasons from September 1998 to May 2000 called Donny & Marie.  The show was produced by Dick Clark and featured news, commentary on current events, and guests from the world of entertainment, as well as segments highlighting the duo's talents. In 2006, she was a judge on the short-lived Fox celeb reality show competition Celebrity Duets, produced by Simon Cowell. The same year it was reported by Entertainment Tonight magazine that Osmond would join the cast of The Bold and the Beautiful, the long-running CBS daytime soap opera, but she never appeared.

On October 1, 2012, she debuted a variety show, Marie, to a record-breaking 320,000 viewers on the Hallmark Channel.  This was the first time she held the production title of executive producer, and they had a run of 150 episodes. Later the show went into reruns on the Reelz Channel before it was canceled in 2013. From 2013 to 2019, Osmond was a regular fill-in on the CBS daytime show The Talk in over 90 episodes whenever a regular host was out. In May 2019, rumors were confirmed that for the show's tenth season, Osmond would join the panel full-time replacing Sara Gilbert when she departed at the end of season nine.

Marie made her debut on The Talk on September 9, 2019, during the season 10 premieres she joined Eve, Sheryl Underwood, Sharon Osbourne, and Carrie Ann Inaba. She stated to USA Today on September 3, 2020, that she would leave The Talk after one season to focus on other work, including several projects she was developing with producer John Redmann, Lifetime Christmas movies, her album "Unexpected", and to spend more time with her husband, children, and grandchildren. . She was replaced by Amanda Kloots.

Radio  

In 2004, Osmond had a radio show syndicated to adult contemporary radio stations, called Marie and Friends, that was canceled after ten months.

Movies and film  

On October 6, 1978, Marie appeared with her brother Donny Osmond in the film Goin' Coconuts (originally titled "Aloha Donny & Marie"), which was not a financial success. On December 8, 1978, Marie starred in the made-for-TV film The Gift of Love opposite Timothy Bottoms. The film was based on the short story "The Gift of The Magi" by O. Henry. On August 19, 1982, Marie appeared in the made-for-TV film Rooster as Sister Mae Davis. The comedy film starred Paul Williams and Pat McCormick. On April 26, 1982, Marie starred in the made-for-TV film Side by Side: The True Story of the Osmond Family. Marie portrayed her mother, Olive Davis. On January 10, 1983, Marie starred in the made-for-TV film I Married Wyatt Earp as Josephine 'Josie' Marcus opposite Bruce Boxleitner as Wyatt Earp and Alison Arngrim as Amy. On October 26, 2019, Marie co-starred in the made-for-TV romantic Christmas comedy, The Road Home for Christmas, as Cassie. This film was shot around her schedule for The Talk. In 2020 she starred as Melanie in the Lifetime movie, "The Christmas Edition," and in 2021, as Margaret in "A Fiancé for Christmas."

Broadway  

During the mid-1990s Osmond had a successful run performing Broadway musicals. She appeared as the lead actress playing Anna Leonowens along with Kevin Gray (as the King of Siam) in the 1994–95 production of The King and I,  and in 1997, she starred in Rodgers and Hammerstein's production of The Sound of Music as Maria. The production sold out in many major cities and received glowing reviews from critics.

Marie and Donny produced a holiday musical called Donny & MarieA Broadway Christmas, which was originally scheduled to play on Broadway at the Marquis Theatre from December 9 to 19, 2010. The show was then extended until December 30, 2010, and again to January 2, 2011.

The Christmas show was so successful that it was turned into a touring production and was a yearly event in several cities across the US.

Author  

Osmond has authored three books, all of which were featured in the New York Times bestsellers list.

Behind the Smile: My Journey Out  

This book was published on May 1, 2001, and discusses her struggles with postpartum depression.

Might As Well Laugh About It Now  

This book focuses on the milestones and missteps in Osmond's life. It was published on April 1, 2009, and was co-authored by Marcia Wilkie.

The Key Is Love  

This book was published on April 2, 2013, with the subtitle My Mother's Wisdom, A Daughter's Gratitude. It focuses on the values of her mother and was co-authored by Marcia Wilkie.

Other work

Sunday Message  

Osmond began providing a Sunday Message via her Facebook page and Instagram several years ago.  Since its inception, it has grown in popularity and has become an inspiration to her many followers. Each message provides wisdom from lessons learned throughout her life.

Las Vegas Show Donny & Marie at Flamingo Hotel 

From September 9, 2008, to November 16, 2019, the brother and sister variety show Donny & Marie was the headliner in the 750-seat showroom at the Flamingo Hotel in Las Vegas, Nevada. The 90-minute show which was originally scheduled for a six-week run continued for eleven years with the last performance on November 16, 2019. A total of 1730 performances, most of any singing act in Vegas history. Osmond and the show earned three of the Las Vegas Review-Journals Best of Las Vegas Awards in 2012 including "Best Show", "Best All-Around Performer" (Donny & Marie), and "Best Singer". The throwback-style Vegas showroom was updated in 2014 and renamed the Donny and Marie Showroom. The singing siblings were backed by eight dancers and a nine-piece band. The format of the show began with Donny and Marie singing together at the beginning and end of the show, with solo segments in between. On the final performance they ended the show with the traditional singing of "May Tomorrow Be a Perfect Day" followed by saying "Goodnight everybody." Several celebrities attended the final show to include Debbie Gibson and Marie's co-hosts of The Talk.

Dancing with the Stars 

On August 29, 2007, it was announced that Osmond would appear as a celebrity contestant on the fifth season of the ABC show, paired with Jonathan Roberts, 2004 US Rising Star Latin Champion. On November 27, 2007, Osmond came in third place on the fifth season of Dancing with the Stars. She fainted after her performance in the fifth week, stating, "I forgot to breathe."

Her brother Donny won the ninth season.

Dolls and embroidery  

In 1991, Osmond debuted her doll line on QVC. While QVC continues to be a primary source of distribution for her dolls, Osmond also carries her line in retail stores, through Internet sales in the United States and worldwide, and via direct response. Her first sculpture, a toddler doll she created and named for her mother, "Olive May", set a collectible record on QVC. Since then, Osmond has sculpted several dolls, including "Remember Me", "Baby Adora Belle", "Kissy and Huggs" and her hallmark doll "Adora Belle". In 2009, Osmond debuted her dolls on the Shopping Channel in Canada. In 2009, a 16-inch vinyl Fashion Doll of Marie Osmond called "Grand Finale Fashion" debuted at Osmond's 50th birthday party in Las Vegas. Osmond's doll collection has garnered numerous award nominations, including "Trendsetter of the Year" and Dolls magazine's "Awards of Excellence".

In 2006, Osmond launched an embroidery machine line, a sewing machine line, and embroidery designs through Bernina. She has been featured on the cover of Designs in Machine Embroidery.

Crafting  

In 2010, Osmond published a book of handcrafted project designs, Marie Osmond's Heartfelt Giving: Sew and Quilt for Family and Friends, (Martingale & Company). The book contained step-by-step instructions for more than 20 projects, all designed by Osmond. Projects include her "Paper Roses" quilt, bags, aprons, and gifts for babies, teens, friends, and pets. The book also features several childhood photos.

Osmond has a line of sewing machines with Janome and a fabric line with Quilting Treasures.

Christmas on Broadway and touring show  

With the success of the 201011 Broadway Christmas show, both Marie and Donny took the show on the road in 2012 and 2013. The 2013 show was sold out in most of the cities where it played and consisted of two 75-minute segments with a brief intermission. Many of the dancers from the Las Vegas show were also used during this tour and incorporated several of the Vegas songs and videos while adding Christmas classics and costumes. The Donny & Marie Christmas Tour continued to entertain audiences during the holidays through the 2018 season.

Caesars Atlantic City Donny & Marie  

The Vegas show was moved to Caesars Atlantic City for a residency in August 2014.  The same backup dancers and band were used along with most of the Vegas wardrobe and set list with some tailoring for the New Jersey audience.  The show ran August 8–21, 2014.

Children's Miracle Network  

Along with actor John Schneider, Osmond co-founded the non-profit organization Children's Miracle Network on August 11, 1983. CMNH is dedicated to saving and improving the lives of children by raising funds for children's hospitals in North America. As of 2022 CMNH has raised more than US$8 billion which is distributed directly to a network of 170 hospitals.

Marie continues to perform and raise money for research and awareness to benefit children's hospitals.

Promotional work  

In 1977 Marie partnered with Kmart to sell a skincare package and a personalized fragrance targeted to young female fans. The skincare line contained a cleanser, rinse, and moisturizer, and the fragrance was advertised as healthy but delicate.

From 1978 to 1982, Marie and her brother Donny did several commercial spots for Hawaiian Punch as advertising spokespeople.

During the 2003 Super Bowl Marie, along with her brother Donny appeared in a commercial for Pepsi. The Pepsi Twist advertisement was a parody of Ozzy Osbourne's son and daughter turning into the famous Osmond siblings during a dream.

For the past 15 years, Marie has partnered with Nutrisystem to promote a healthy lifestyle. In 201516, Marie and her husband Steve appeared on QVC with a home workout product, the Body Gym.

Osmond promoted a line of emergency food storage solutions for Wise Foods. She signed on in September 2013 as the company spokesperson using her likeness on the company website and TV commercials. As of 2016, there is no longer any reference to her on the company's website.

In January 2018 Marie became the strategic advisor and owner of MD Complete, a line of skincare regimens available online and in national retail big box stores.

In the summer of 2020, Osmond became the spokesperson for Publishers Clearing House  (PCH), a direct marketing company in television advertisements, online and direct-to-consumer mailers.

Management  

In 1976, Karl Engemann began managing the recording careers of Donny, Marie, and Jimmy Osmond, plus the Osmond Brothers group. In 1979 Engemann was appointed personal manager in various career stages of all the Osmond entities, and finally just Marie Osmond. In December 2009, he parted company with Marie. Marie is currently managed by Greg and Darla Sperry of Sperry Development.

Personal life 

Osmond has been married three times, twice to the same man.

Before marrying, she was engaged in May 1979 to Jeff Crayton, an acting student, but in July of that year, they broke their engagement.  During an episode of Watch What Happens Live in January 2019 she told host Andy Cohen that she briefly dated Erik Estrada. She also dated the singer Andy Gibb around the same time. 

Osmond's first marriage was to Stephen Lyle Craig, a Brigham Young University basketball player, on June 26, 1982. Their only child, Stephen James Craig, was born in 1983. The two divorced in October 1985.

On October 28, 1986, Osmond married Brian Blosil at the Jordan River Temple in Utah. Osmond and Blosil had two children, Rachael and Matthew. They also adopted five children: Jessica, Michael, Brandon, Brianna, and Abigail. Osmond and Blosil announced their imminent divorce in March 2007.  Both parties released a joint statement stating that neither one assigned fault for the divorce.

In 1999, Osmond said that she suffered from severe postpartum depression. She co-authored a book called Behind the Smile with Marcia Wilkie and Dr. Judith Moore which chronicles her experiences with the illness. In August 2006, several U.S. tabloids suggested that she had attempted suicide. Those reports were denied by her publicity team, which claimed she had suffered an adverse reaction to a medication she was taking.

On February 26, 2010, Osmond and Blosil's adoptive son Michael killed himself by jumping from the eighth floor of his apartment building in Los Angeles. He reportedly battled depression and addiction and had been in rehabilitation at the age of 12. An autopsy found no drugs in his system.

On May 4, 2011, Osmond remarried her first husband, Stephen Lyle Craig in a small ceremony in the Las Vegas Nevada Temple wearing her dress from the 1982 wedding. The couple remarried a few months before attending their son's wedding

In March 2020 she stated that she will leave her fortune to charity upon her death stating that it would be a disservice to her children to leave the money to them noting that they need to make their own money.

Discography

Paper Roses (1973)
In My Little Corner of the World (1974)
Who's Sorry Now (1975)
This is the Way That I Feel (1977)
There's No Stopping Your Heart (1985)
I Only Wanted You (1986)
All in Love (1988)
Steppin' Stone (1989)
I Can Do This (2010)
Music Is Medicine (2016)
Unexpected (2021)

Filmography

Awards and nominations

In 1976, Donny and Marie Osmond received the Golden Plate Award of the American Academy of Achievement presented by Awards Council members Ray Charles and Cloris Leachman.

In 1979, Osmond was named one of Ladies' Home Journal Women of the Year. The award was presented at the Ladies' Home Journal Building in New York City.

In 2018, Marie was awarded "The Secretary of Defense Medal for Outstanding Public Service" by 4-Star General Bob Brown, US Army Pacific (representing Secretary of Defense James Mattis).

On October 4, 2019, Marie, along with her brother Donny were honored by the Las Vegas Walk of Stars and received a star on the famous Las Vegas strip. October 4 is now officially known as Donny & Marie day in Las Vegas.

References

External links

Marie Osmond Official website
 

Marie Osmond Getting Divorced – People magazine, March 30, 2007
BBC News, Marie Osmond sings Paper Roses for Kilmarnock fans, 1 February 2013

1959 births
20th-century American actresses
Actresses from Utah
American child singers
American women country singers
American country singer-songwriters
American musical theatre actresses
American women pop singers
American television actresses
American television personalities
American women television personalities
Country pop musicians
Latter Day Saints from Utah
Musicians from Ogden, Utah
The Osmonds members
Living people
Osmond family (show business)
Singer-songwriters from Utah